Maibi are the priestess of Manipur Kingdom commonly known for performing religious rites. They are considered as shamans as well as midwives. They possess various skills of religious activities and ancient medicinal knowledge.

The male counterpart is a Maiba

See also 
 Sanamahism

References 

Manipur
Priestesses
Nurses
Asian shamanism
Sanamahism